Masaaba Sariki Fanyinama III is the paramount chief of the Wangara Community of Ghana. He resides in a Zongo area popularly called Targona Line at Kintampo, a town in the Bono East Region. He plays host to the annual Benkadi Kurubi Festival of the Wangara Community of Ghana.

References

People from Bono East Region
Living people
Year of birth missing (living people)